Lunch in L.A. is a solo album by pianist Tete Montoliu (with one duet with Chick Corea) recorded in 1979 and released on the Contemporary label.

Reception

Scott Yanow of AllMusic stated: "For what was probably his only session for an American label, the great pianist Tete Montoliu is heard in top form... Excellent playing".

Track listing
All compositions by Tete Montoliu, except as indicated
 "Airegin" (Sonny Rollins) – 3:48
 "Blues Before Lunch" – 7:03
 "I Want to Talk About You" (Billy Eckstine) – 12:22
 "Put Your Little Foot Right Out" (Larry Spier) – 9:30
 "Blues After Lunch" – 5:41 		
 "Sophisticated Lady" (Duke Ellington, Irving Mills, Mitchell Parish) – 7:07
 "Margareta" (Perry Robinson) – 8:40

Personnel
 Tete Montoliu – piano
 Chick Corea – piano (track 4)

References

Tete Montoliu albums
1980 albums
Contemporary Records albums
Solo piano jazz albums